La costanza trionfante degl'amori e degl'odii is a dramma per musica by Antonio Vivaldi. The Italian libretto was by A Marchi.

The opera was first performed at the Teatro San Moisè in Venice on 18 January 1716, during carnival. It was revived for the same theatre at the Carnival of 1718, under the title Artabano, re de' Parti.

Roles

References

1716 operas
Operas by Antonio Vivaldi
Opera seria
Italian-language operas
Operas